Wazirabad (Urdu/) is a city in Punjab, Pakistan. It is the capital of Wazirabad District.
Famous for its cutlery products, it is known as the city of cutlery and is also quite famous for its foods.

Wazirabad is situated on the banks of the Chenab River nearly 100 kilometres north of Lahore on the Grand Trunk Road. It is 45 kilometres from Sialkot, 30 kilometres from Gujranwala, and about 12 kilometres from Gujrat. The city of Wazirabad is the headquarters of Wazirabad Tehsil, an administrative subdivision of the district, the city itself is subdivided into 12 Union Councils.

History
The city was founded by Wazir Khan, the governer and later, Grand Vizier of Mughal Emperor Shah Jahan in 17th century. The town was taken over by Charat Singh around 1760 together with other towns in the District. Maharaja Ranjit Singh occupied the town in 1809 and Avitabile was appointed as the Nazim of the city. In 1855, Jarral Rajputs of Rajouri Own Saman Burj Wazirabad & Ruled Wazirabad as a Royal Family. He built an entirely new town, with a straight broad Bazar running through it, and side streets at right angles.

British rule
During British rule Wazirabad was the headquarters of the old Wazirabad District, broken up in 1851-2, and was the site of a cantonment removed to Sialkot in 1855.

The municipality was created in 1867, the population according to the 1901 census was 18,069. The income during the ten years ending 1902-3 averaged Rs. 20,800, and the expenditure Rs. 21,400. In 1903-4 the income was Rs. 20,800, chiefly from octroi; and the expenditure was Rs. 19,200. The town had a considerable trade in timber, which comes down the Chenab from Jammu territory. The smiths of Wazirabad had a reputation for the manufacture of small articles of cutlery, and the town of Nizamabad within a mile of the town is famed for its weapons. Wazirabad was an important junction on the North-Western Railway, as the Sialkot-Jammu and Lyallpur lines both branch off of here.

The Chenab river is spanned opposite Wazirabad by the Alexandra railway bridge, one of the finest engineering works of the kind in India, which was opened by in 1876 by Edward VII the King-Emperor when he was Prince of Wales. The town possessed two Anglo-vernacular high schools, one maintained by the Church of Scotland Mission, and a Government dispensary.

Educational institutes

Colleges
 Govt. Associate College of Commercem, Bhattikay Road Wazirabad
 Govt. Maulana Zafar Ali Khan Degree College.
 Govt.Post Graduate College for Women Wazirabad.
 Punjab Group of Colleges.
 Superior Group of Colleges.
 Apex Group of colleges.
 Aspire Group of colleges.
 ATA Institute of Engineering and Technology.
 ILM College Wazirabad.
 Chenab College of IT and Commerce.
 Sir Syed College For Girls and Boys.
 VITAL College For Girls & Boys.
 Shahzaib Ahsan Medical College For Girls & Boys Basti Qudartabad.

Cityscape

Inside the Old City, the First Residential Complex was built called Musamman Burj. It was constructed by Ilm ul din, a confidant of Jehangir and was completed in 1636 AD during Shahjehan's Rule. 
Opposite the Musamman Burj, there is the Main Bazar (Market) which is absolute Wide, is about 2 km long and ends in the South of the City at Lahori Gate.

Another House called Kothi Sheik Niaz Ahmed was Constructed outside the old city about 2 km from the Burj 
on the road leading to Nizamabad but silently, the city outgrew its boundaries.
Kothi and Mussamman Burj both are now in the centre of Wazirabad thanks to the Urban Sprawl and Rapid Industrialization of the city.

Architecture

Built-in the british Colonial era, the bridge was constructed to carry the Punjab Northern State Railway over the River Chenab.
The First Brick was Laid on 1 November 1871, and completed in 1876, Though Later in 1878 necessary alterations were made.

Dak Chowki
The Dak chowki (mail station) is an age-old monument built by Sher Shah Suri in 1542 A.D. It has now been declared a protected monument and is planned to be restored.

Gurdwara
The Forlorn Gurdwara known as Gurdwara Gurukotha is situated in the city, built by the Orders of Ranjit Singh in memory of Guru har Gobind, the sixth of the Sikh gurus (1595-1640), for he stayed in Wazirabad during his long travels preaching through Punjab and Kashmir.
The spherical, segmented dome of Gurukotha gurdwara rises in splendour above the skyline of the city and is balanced off by four domes at the corner.

Transportation

Highways
Wazirabad is situated alongside the N-5 National Highway Which connects it to the nearby city District of Gujrat in the north and Gujranwala and the Provincial Capital Lahore in the south.
Multiple Dual Carriageway also connect the city to Gujrat, Sialkot, Daska and Gujranwala.

E3 Expressway
The E3 Expressway or Kot Sarwar–Hafizabad–Wazirabad Expressway is a controlled-access expressway that links the N-5 National Highway at Wazirabad with the M-2/M-4 junction near Kot Sarwar, in Punjab, Pakistan.
E3 also Connects the City with the Tehsil's Union councils in the nearby areas.

Rail
Wazirabad Junction railway station is located in the city which has the Main Line 1 (ML-1) Karachi-Peshawar Line, Khanewal-Wazirabad Branch Line and Wazirabad-Narowal Branch Line

Notable residents

 
 Abdul Mannan Wazirabadi, Islamic scholar
 Fazal Ilahi Wazirabadi, Islamic scholar and freedom fighter
 Hamid Nasir Chattha, former Speaker of the National Assembly of Pakistan
 Raja Khalique Ullah Khan, former Provincial Minister Law & Parliamentary Affairs, and Education Minister
 Iftikhar Cheema, Retired Justice and Member National Assembly for 3 tenures
 Nisar Ahmed Cheema, Ex-DG Health Punjab and Member National Assembly
 Jawwad S. Khawaja, 23rd Chief Justice of Pakistan
 Atif Aslam, singer
 S. A. Rahman, fifth Chief Justice of Pakistan
 Shaikh Nazrul Bakar, civil servant
 Noon Meem Rashid, a progressive poet
 Munnu Bhai, writer
 ul Haq Qasmi Writer
 Razia Butt, writer
 Krishan Chander, writer
 Maulana Zafar Ali Khan, writer, poet, and journalist
  Dr.Shaista Nuzhat, poet, writer, columnist and bureaucrat
 Mohammad Abdul Ghafoor Hazarvi: Muslim theologian, orator and revivalist 
    leader
 Mazhar ul Islam, writer
 Raja Mehdi Ali Khan
 Allah Bakhsh (painter)
 [[Dr.Masood Qureshi]{Homoepathic}Founder Dr.Masood Hoeopathic Pharmaceuticals Lahore
 Ahmed Nasim[Inspector General (R) Pakistan Railway Police
 Qazi Zulfiqar ali Qureshi(PSP)[Inspectpor General Punjab Police(R)] 
 Zulfiqar Ahmed Cheema(PSP)[Inspector General Motorway Police(R)]
 Syed Lakhte Hussnain(Chairman Muslim Hands International U.K)

References

Further reading

Cities and towns in Gujranwala District
Populated places established in the 17th century
Populated places in Wazirabad Tehsil